Daisuke Tanabe is a Japanese electronic musician and music producer, known for his work in the styles of intelligent dance music (IDM) and jungle.

Early life
Tanabe was born in Hyōgo Prefecture, Japan, and moved around the country during his childhood before settling in Chiba Prefecture. As of 2014, he still resides in Chiba Prefecture, in the city of Kashiwa.

Career
Tanabe has described himself as having "[fidgeted] with shitty synths" prior to the age of 15, before discovering artists associated with the British Warp record label and the UK electronica scene.

In 2010, Tanabe released his debut album, Before I Forget. That same year, Tanabe met UK-based dance/electronica producer Kidkanevil as participants in that year's London edition of the Red Bull Music Academy. Following this, they formed a collaborative project under the moniker of Kidsuke; their debut album as a duo, Kidsuke, was released in 2012.

Tanabe has utilized the software Ableton Live for his live performances, and Logic Pro for writing his compositions. In 2016, he toured India, which included playing a set at Magnetic Fields Festival in Rajasthan. In 2018, he released an extended play (EP) titled Cat Steps through the Mumbai-based record label Knowmad, and went on a tour to promote the EP in September of that year.

Discography

Singles
 "circle line" (2007)
 "Alice" (2014)
 "cpra" (2016)
 "late night fishing" (2017)

EPs
 Flowers on a Wall (2012)
 achilles (2015)
 Cat Steps (2018)
 ten (2020)

Albums
 Before I Forget (2010; remastered and re-released in 2022)
 Floating Underwater (2014)

Collaborations
as Kidsuke (with Kidkanevil)
 Kidsuke (2012)

with Jealousguy
 Zoooriginals #1 (2012)

References

Further reading

External links
 Daisuke Tanabe on Bandcamp

21st-century Japanese male musicians
Japanese dance musicians
Japanese electronic musicians
Japanese electronica musicians
Japanese record producers
Year of birth missing (living people)
Living people